A total lunar eclipse will take place on Monday, October 18, 2032.

This is the 43rd member of Lunar Saros 127. The previous event is the October 2014 lunar eclipse. The next event is the October 2050 lunar eclipse.

Visibility

Related lunar eclipses

Lunar year series

Tritos series

Saros series
Lunar saros series 127, repeating every 18 years and 11 days, has a total of 72 lunar eclipse events including 54 umbral lunar eclipses (38 partial lunar eclipses and 16 total lunar eclipses). Solar Saros 134 interleaves with this lunar saros with an event occurring every 9 years 5 days alternating between each saros series.

See also
List of lunar eclipses and List of 21st-century lunar eclipses

Notes

External links

2032-10
2032-10
2032 in science